Miguel Álvarez Santamaría (born 29 September 1945) is a Mexican politician from the Institutional Revolutionary Party. From 2009 to 2012 he served as Deputy of the LXI Legislature of the Mexican Congress representing Guerrero.

References

1945 births
Living people
Politicians from Guerrero
Institutional Revolutionary Party politicians
21st-century Mexican politicians
Mexican dentists
Deputies of the LXI Legislature of Mexico
Members of the Chamber of Deputies (Mexico) for Guerrero